Love Songs is a compilation album by American singer and recording artist Michael Jackson. It was released on January 15, 2002, by Motown Records as a part of Motown's Love Songs line. The album contains 14 love songs and ballads Michael Jackson recorded, either by himself or with The Jackson 5, during his Motown tenure. Some of these were solo hits by Michael, such as "Got to Be There", and Jackson 5 hits, such as "Who's Lovin' You". It also includes an unreleased  version of The Jackson 5 hit, "I'll Be There", and the rare original mix of Michael's "Call on Me".

Track listing 
Tracks 1, 2, 7, 11 and 14 sung by The Jackson 5.

References 

2002 compilation albums
Michael Jackson compilation albums
Motown compilation albums